Dust on Mother's Bible is an album by Buck Owens and his Buckaroos, released in 1966. It reached Number one on the Billboard Country charts.

It was re-released on CD in 2003 by Sundazed Records.

Reception

In his Allmusic review, critic Thom Jurek wrote of the CD reissue "...this is no ordinary country gospel album. This isn't the Carters or the Louvins. This is honky tonk country gospel done Bakersfield style. Owens toned down his Buckaroos approach not a bit to record this... the slippery guitar and pedal steel-heavy arrangements make this record feel more like a late-night barroom drinking and dancing set than something to be played for church. Dust on Mother's Bible is one of the great Buckaroos albums and once again displays Owens' singular place in the pantheon of country music."

Track listing

Side one
 "Pray Every Day" (Buck Owens, Red Simpson) – 2:09
 "When Jesus Calls All His Children In" (Owens, Simpson) – 2:17
 "I'll Go to the Church Again With Momma" (Owens, Simpson) – 3:03
 "Bring It to Jesus" (Buck Owens, Bonnie Owens) – 2:12
 "Jesus Saved Me" (Owens, Simpson) – 2:25
 "Would You Be Ready?" (Don Rich) – 2:01

Side two
 "Dust on Mother's Bible" (Owens) – 3:30
 "Satan's Gotta Get Along Without Me" (Owens, Simpson) – 2:04
 "Where Would I Be Without Jesus" (Don Sessions) – 2:11
 "Eternal Vacation" (Owens, Owens) – 2:58
 "It Was With Love" (Loudilla Johnson, Don Rich) – 2:33
 "All the Way With Jesus" (Owens, Owens) – 2:06

Personnel
Buck Owens – guitar, vocals
Don Rich – guitar, fiddle, vocals
Tom Brumley – pedal steel guitar
Willie Cantu – drums
Bobby Austin – bass
Doyle Holly – guitar, vocals
Wayne Stong – drums
Red Simpson – guitar
George French, Jr. – piano

References

1966 albums
Buck Owens albums
Capitol Records albums
Albums produced by Ken Nelson (United States record producer)
Gospel albums by American artists

Albums recorded at Capitol Studios